Belinda (For You) is a Mexican telenovela that aired in 2004 on TV Azteca's Azteca 13. It starred Leonardo Garcia and Mariana Torres as protagonists.

Cast

Main protagonists

{| class="wikitable"
|- bgcolor="#CCCCCC"
! Actor || Character || Known as
|-
| Mariana Torres || Belinda Arismendi || Main heroine. Daughter of Roberto and Cristina, in love with Ricardo 
|-
| Leonardo Garcia || Ricardo Semprum Latorre  || Main hero. Son of Adolfo|-
| Héctor Bonilla || Roberto Arismendi || Father of Anabela and Belinda, husband of Lucrecia                                     
|-
| Anna Ciocchetti || Lucrecia Fuenmayor de Arismendi ||  Villain. Wife of Roberto; mother of Anabela and Alfredo|-
| Sebastián Ligarde || Adolfo Semprum Inchaustegui  || Villain. Father of Ricardo, Helena and Alfredo|-
| Regina Torne || Eloisa Fuenmayor || Mother of Lucrecia and Renata |-
| Laura Padilla || Renata Fuenmayor || Daughter of Eloisa, sister of Lucrecia, mother of Gustavo|-
| Gabriela Vergara || Cristina Romero / Belinda Romero|| Mother of Belinda / Sister of Cristina, aunt of Belinda Arismendi|}

Other cast

Theme song

Amor MioSingersTres de CopasWritersAdaptationEditor''

External links

2004 telenovelas
2004 Mexican television series debuts
2004 Mexican television series endings
Mexican telenovelas
TV Azteca telenovelas
Spanish-language telenovelas